Fernandina Beach is a city in northeastern Florida and the county seat of Nassau County, Florida, United States. It is the northernmost city on Florida's Atlantic coast, situated on Amelia Island, and is one of the principal municipalities comprising Greater Jacksonville. The area was first inhabited by the Timucuan Indian people. Known as the "Isle of 8 Flags", Amelia Island has had the flags of the following nations flown over it: France, Spain, Great Britain, Spain (again), the Republic of East Florida (1812), the Republic of the Floridas (1817), Mexico, the Confederate States of America, and the United States.

The French, English, and Spanish all maintained a presence on Amelia Island at various times during the 16th, 17th, and 18th centuries, but the Spanish established Fernandina. The town of Fernandina, which was about a mile from the present city, was named in honor of King Ferdinand VII of Spain by the governor of the Spanish province of East Florida, Enrique White. Fernandina has the distinction of being the last Spanish city platted in the Western Hemisphere, in 1811.

According to the 2010 census, the city population was 11,487. It is the seat of Nassau County. It is also the largest incorporated city in the county since Yulee is an unincorporated town.

History

Prior to the arrival of Europeans on what is now Amelia Island, Native Americans occupied the site of the original town of Fernandina. Native American bands associated with the Timucuan mound-building culture had settled on the island about 1000 CE, calling it Napoyca. They remained on the island until the early 18th century, when European settlement began.

Old Town Fernandina

On January 1, 1811, Enrique White, governor of Spain's East Florida province, named the town of Fernandina, about a mile from the present city, in honor of King Ferdinand VII. On May 10 of that year, Fernandina became the last town platted under the Laws of the Indies in the Western hemisphere. The town was intended as a bulwark against U.S. territorial expansion. In the following years, it was captured and recaptured by a succession of renegades and privateers.

Republic of East Florida
At the beginning of the Patriot War, with the approval of President James Madison and Georgia Governor George Mathews on March 13, 1812, insurgents known as the "Patriots of Amelia Island" seized the island. After raising a Patriot flag, they replaced it with the United States flag. American gunboats under the command of Commodore Hugh Campbell maintained control of the island. On May 15, 1812, the British brig. Sappho fired on Gunboat no. 168, which had fired on the loyalist merchant vessel Fernando to prevent her leaving. Outgunned, the American gunboat withdrew, which enabled several vessels to escape from the port. President Madison eventually denounced the filibustering of George Mathews, however, on the grounds that Mathews had violated his instructions.

Mexico
Spanish pressure forced the American evacuation from the island in 1813. Spanish forces erected Fort San Carlos on the island in 1816. However, A Scottish soldier and adventurer named Gregor MacGregor with 55 musketeers seized Fort San Carlos in 1817, claiming the island on behalf of "the brethren of Mexico, Buenos Ayres, New Grenada and Venezuela", and raised the Green Cross of Florida flag over the Spanish Fort San Carlos.
MacGregor claimed to be Brigadier General of the armies of the United Provinces of New Grenada and Venezuela (where he had successfully fought and led troops), and General-in-Chief of the armies for the two Floridas, commissioned by the Supreme Director of Mexico.

Spanish soldiers forced MacGregor's withdrawal, but their attempt to regain complete control was foiled by American irregulars organized by Ruggles Hubbard and former Pennsylvania congressman Jared Irwin. Hubbard and Irwin later joined forces with the French-born pirate Louis Aury, who laid claim to the island on behalf of the Republic of Mexico. U.S. Navy forces drove Aury from the island, and President James Monroe vowed to hold Amelia Island "in trust for Spain."

Modern Fernandina
In 1847 construction of Fort Clinch began in nearby present-day Fernandina. The Third System fort was named after General Duncan Lamont Clinch who fought in the War of 1812 and the Seminole Wars. Senator David Levy Yulee, founder of the Florida Railroad, wanted the eastern terminus of his railroad line to end in Amelia Island. The Old Town Fernandina was too cut off by the marshes to be used as a terminal. Yulee wanted to end the railroad on the banks of the Amelia River one mile to the south. The leaders of Fernandina did not want a new community to grow and prosper to surpass their town. The leaders of Fernandina decided to move the town up to the railroad where the present-day Fernandina Beach stands. Yulee began construction of the railroad in 1855 and was completed in 1861.

Civil War

On January 8, 1861, two days before Florida's secession, Confederate sympathizers (the Third Regiment of Florida Volunteers) took control of Fort Clinch, already abandoned by the Federal workers who had been enlarging the structure. The Confederates erected batteries on the northern end of Amelia Island but lacked the resources to fortify Fort Clinch. Robert E. Lee, who was commanding coastal defenses in the Deep South, ordered cannons and troops withdrawn in early 1862.

Lee's orders to withdraw the cannons and troops were too late. Union forces, consisting of 28 gunboats commanded by Commodore Samuel Dupont, occupied the island on March 3, 1862, and raised the American flag. In January 1863, the first all-black regiment of former slaves recruited to fight for the Union was read Lincoln's Emancipation Proclamation at Fernandina. Three weeks later they set sail up the St. Marys River to engage the Confederate forces. The Union used the fort as a base for its operations in the area for the remainder of the war.

Later 19th century
In 1891, Harmon Murray, who had been the leader of a criminal gang operating out of Gainesville, arrived in Fernandina, where his sister lived. Murray was soon committing burglaries and robberies in Fernandina and elsewhere on Amelia Island. Law officers chased a black suspect several times, who shot at them on one occasion. Murray taunted the police with a letter in early May, to the effect that he would not be taken alive, and would take the Nassau County sheriff and Fernandina police chief with him. Acting on a tip, on May 16 police surrounded the house Murray was staying in. Murray heard the officers getting into position, and shot and killed deputy sheriff Joseph W. Robinson. In the ensuing gun battle Murray wounded Fernandina Police Chief James Higgenbotham. Although grazed on the wrist and scalp, Murray was able to escape. Despite the intensive manhunt for him, Murray was able to slip off of Amelia Island to the mainland. The City of Fernandina offered a reward for the capture of Murray, "dead or alive".

Geography

It is the northernmost city on the eastern coast of Florida.

Climate

Fernandina Beach has a humid subtropical climate (Cfa) with long, hot, and rainy summers and short, mild winters.

Economy 

In 2020, the total value of products produced in Fernandina Beach, Florida was $87.9 million.

Demographics

As of the 2020 United States census, there were 13,052 people and 5,869 households in the city. There were 2.12 persons per household. The racial makeup of the city was 80.1% White, 11.7% African American, 1.7% Asian, and 3.1% from two or more races. Hispanics or Latinos of any race were 11.9% of the population.

Of the population, 4.0% were under 5 years old, 10.8% were under 18 years old, and 33.5% were 65 years or older. 49.8% of the population were female. There were a reported 1,576 veterans living in the city. 8.8% of the population were foreign born persons. 9.4% of those under the age of 65 years old lived with a disability and 15.1% of that same population did not have health insurance.

81.0% of the housing units were owner-occupied. The median value of those owner-occupied housing units was $356,600. The median gross rent was $1,041. The median household income was $80,260 with a per capita income of $50,051. 10.2% of the population lived below the Poverty threshold.

97.9% of households had a computer and 96.5% had a broadband internet subscription. 95.5% of the population 25 years and older were high school graduates or higher and 45.5% of that same population had a bachelor's degree or higher.

Ethnicity
As of 2016 the largest self-reported ancestries/ethnicities in Fernandina Beach, Florida were:

Government and infrastructure
Nassau County Fire Rescue operates Station 20 on the south end of Amelia Island, as well as Station 70 Oneil.

The Fernandina Beach Municipal Airport is a general aviation airfield approximately three miles south of the city that serves Amelia Island.

Education

The public schools of Fernandina Beach are part of the Nassau County School District. They include:
 Southside Elementary School (PreK–2) 
 Emma Love Hardee Elementary School (3–5) 
 Fernandina Beach Middle School (6–8) 
 Fernandina Beach High School (9–12)

Private schools:
 Amelia Island Montessori School (Preschool–8)
Fernandina Beach Christian Academy (K–8)
St Michael Academy (PreK–8)

Note: Atlantic Elementary (2nd and 3rd grades) was closed at the end of the 2008 school year. After the closing, 2nd grade was moved to Southside and 3rd grade to Emma Love. Also, the private Catholic school, St. Michael's Academy, is in downtown Fernandina Beach. All three Fernandina Beach public schools are "A" rated by the State of Florida. The nickname of Fernandina Beach High School's athletic teams is the "Pirates". Amelia Island Montessori School is near American Beach and is accredited by the Florida Council of Independent Schools and is an associate member school with the American Montessori Society.

Nassau County Public Library operates the Fernandina Beach Branch.

Notable people

 William B. Allen, political scientist who was chairman of the United States Commission on Civil Rights from 1988 to 1989, was born in Fernandina Beach in 1944
 Liberty Billings, Reconstruction era politician 
 Raymond A. Brown, attorney whose clients included Black Liberation Army member Assata Shakur, boxer Rubin "Hurricane" Carter and "Dr. X" physician Mario Jascalevich
 George Rainsford Fairbanks, a Confederate Major in the U.S. Civil War, he was also a historian, lawyer and Florida State Senator. The Fairbanks House is listed on the NRHP and is operated as a bed and breakfast lodging establishment
 Joseph Finegan, businessman, Brigadier general for the Confederate States Army; resident of Fernandina Beach
 Anna Madgigine Jai Kingsley, wife of slave trader and planter Zephaniah Kingsley, lived in Fernandina (at the time it was not yet Fernandina Beach) during all of 1814 and part of 1815.
 Samuel Petty, politician
 Rick Stockstill, football head coach at Middle Tennessee; raised in Fernandina Beach
 David Levy Yulee, Florida Territorial representative to Congress and the first U.S. Senator from Florida when it became a state, member of the Confederate Congress, builder of Florida's first cross-state railroad (Fernandina to Cedar Key), and the first person of Jewish ancestry to serve as a United States Senator. There is a statue of Yulee in the town

Attractions
The 1988 fantasy film The New Adventures of Pippi Longstocking was filmed in Fernandina Beach and at soundstages in Jacksonville. The house that stood in for Villa Villekulla, Pippi's home, is known locally as Captain Bell's House and is on Estrada Street in the Old Town area directly across from the Fernandina Plaza (parade ground for the Spanish fort) and overlooking the Amelia River.

The Isle of Eight Flags Shrimp Festival occurs annually over the first weekend in May. Events and activities of the festival include vendors with seafood, arts, crafts, collectibles and antiques, live music, the Miss Shrimp Festival pageant, a fireworks display and a parade.

Historic places
 Original Town of Fernandina Historic Site
 Fairbanks House
 Historic Nassau County Courthouse
 United States Post Office, Custom House, and Courthouse (Fernandina, Florida, 1912)
 Fort Clinch State Park
 See National Register of Historic Places listings in Nassau County, Florida

References

External links

 City of Fernandina Beach
 Fernandina Beach News-Leader, full text with full page images, freely available in the Florida Digital Newspaper Library
 Fernandina Express, 1880s historic newspaper freely available with full text and full page images in the Florida Digital Newspaper Library
http://www.floridastateparks.org/fortclinch/default.cfm, the State's official web site for Fort Clinch

 
County seats in Florida
Cities in Nassau County, Florida
Cities in the Jacksonville metropolitan area
Cities in Florida
Populated coastal places in Florida on the Atlantic Ocean
1811 establishments in the Spanish Empire
Populated places established in 1811
Amelia Island